The von Kantzow family is the name of a noble family most likely from the German part of Pomerania, and is sometimes listed without the leading nobiliary particle von. This family gained noble status in Sweden in 1812, was declared to be of baron status in 1821, and was introduced in Sweden's House of Knights in 1822 as family no. 376. 

The name von Kantzow or Kantzow may refer to:

Carin von Kantzow (1888–1931), Swedish noblewoman
Hans von Kantzow (1887–1979), Swedish engineer and inventor
Nils von Kantzow (1885–1967), Swedish gymnast
Sydney de Kantzow (1914–1957), Australian businessman
Thomas Kantzow (1505–1542), Pomeranian scholar

References 

Swedish noble families
German-language surnames